Lewis William "Sport" McAllister (July 23, 1874 – July 17, 1962) was a professional baseball player. He played seven seasons in Major League Baseball with the Cleveland Spiders (1896–1899), Detroit Tigers (1901–1903), and Baltimore Orioles (1902). He was a versatile switch hitter who played every position during his major league career. He played 147 games in the outfield, 83 at catcher, 65 at first base, 62 at shortstop, 27 at third base, and 7 at second base. He also pitched in 17 games, including 10 complete games.

In seven major league seasons, McAllister had a .247 batting average, with 358 hits, 61 extra base hits, 32 stolen bases, and 164 RBIs. His best season was 1901, the first season of the American League as a major league. He played 90 games for the Detroit Tigers and batted .301. McAllister and Kid Elberfeld became the first .300 hitters for the Tigers.

McAllister also was the umpire in a July 15, 1900 minor league game between Cleveland and Detroit. After hostilities with the umpire the previous day, Tigers manager Tommy Burns feared that the crowd would injure umpire Joe Cantillon. Burns forfeited the game, but Cleveland manager Jimmy McAleer agreed to play using reserve player McAllister as the umpire. Detroit won 6–1.

After retiring as a player, McAllister found his way to the University of Michigan and served two stints as the Wolverines' head baseball coach, in 1905-06 and again in 1908-09.

McAllister died in Wyandotte, Michigan, a southern suburb of Detroit in 1962 at age 87.

References

External links 

Major League Baseball outfielders
Detroit Tigers players
Cleveland Spiders players
Baltimore Orioles (1901–02) players
Baseball players from Mississippi
Minor league baseball managers
Fort Worth Panthers players
Houston Mudcats players
Waco Tigers players
Vicksburg (minor league baseball) players
Detroit Tigers (Western League) players
Buffalo Bisons (minor league) players
Montreal Royals players
Newark Indians players
Toronto Maple Leafs (International League) players
Baltimore Orioles (IL) players
Topeka Jayhawks players
Rochester Hustlers players
Lincoln Tigers players
Michigan Wolverines baseball coaches
19th-century baseball players

1874 births
1962 deaths